Giorgio Albani (born 15 June 1929 – 29 July 2015) was an Italian racing cyclist. He rode in ten editions of the Giro d'Italia, and won seven stages.

Major results

1949
3rd Coppa Ugo Agostoni
1950
1st Coppa Ugo Agostoni
1st Stage 1 Giro di Sicilia
2nd Giro della Romagna
3rd Trofeo Baracchi
1951
1st Milano-Modena
2nd Milano–Torino
2nd Giro dell'Emilia
1952
1st Giro del Piemonte
1st Giro dell'Appennino
10th Overall Giro d'Italia
1st Stages 1 & 7
1953
1st Giro del Lazio
1st Stage 1b Roma-Napoli-Roma
1st Stage 11 Giro d'Italia
1st Coppa Bernocchi
1954
1st Stage 7 Giro d'Italia
1st Giro dell'Appennino
1st Stage 1b Roma-Napoli-Roma
1st Tre Valli Varesine
6th Giro di Lombardia
1955
1st Stage 13 Giro d'Italia
3rd Milan-Turin
1956
1st Stages 16 & 20 Giro d'Italia
1st Giro del Veneto
1st  National Road Race Championships
2nd Gran Premio Industria e Commercio di Prato
2nd Tre Valli Varesine
3rd Trofeo Baracchi
1957
1st Giro di Campania
3rd National Road Race Championships
3rd Giro di Toscana
1959
5th Tre Valli Varesine

References

External links

1929 births
2015 deaths
Italian male cyclists
Italian Giro d'Italia stage winners
Sportspeople from Monza
Cyclists from the Province of Monza e Brianza